This is the discography of French singer and songwriter M. Pokora.

Albums

Studio albums
As part of Linkup

Solo

Special releases
2013: À la poursuite du bonheur / Mise à jour (re-release)

Live albums

Singles
As part of Linkup
2003: "Mon étoile"
2003: "Une seconde d'éternité"
2004: "You and Me Bubblin'" (Blue and Linkup)

Solo singles

*Single did not appear in official Belgian (Wallonia) Ultratop 50 chart, but rather in the Ultratip bubbling under charts. Position reflected in table is by adding 50 additional positions to actual Ultratip chart position.

Other charted songs

DVDs 
 2005 "Un an avec M. Pokora" (One year with M. Pokora)
 2007 "100% VIP" (with Alexandra Gas)
 2006 "Player Tour"
 2012 "A La Poursuite Du Bonheur Tour"
 2015 "M.Pokora 10 ans de Carrière Symphonic Show"

Guest appearances
 2004 "Chanter qu'on les aime", a charity single by Amade
 2005 "Protège-toi", a charity single by Collectif Protection Rapprochée
 2005 "Et puis la terre...", a charity single by A.S.I.E.
 2006 "Oh" (French Remix) by Ciara
 2006 "L'Or de nos vies", a charity single from Fight Aids
 2006 "rainbfever.com" by Amine featured on "Raï'n'B Fever 2"
 2007 "Ne me dis pas", featured on "Mon Hold-Up" by Tyron Carter
 2007 "Girls", featured on "Lady Sweety" by Lady Sweety
 2007 "Je fais de toi mon essentiel" by Emmanuel Moire featured on the charity album "Le Roi Soleil – De Monaco à Versailles (Live) – Fight Aids"
 2007 "S'aimer est interdit" by Anne-Laure Girbal featured on the charity album "Le Roi Soleil – De Monaco à Versailles (Live) – Fight Aids"
 2010 "Un respect mutuel", a charity single by Collectif Kilomaitre
 2010 "Talking About a Revolution", featured on the charity album "Message (AIDES)"
 2010 "Let's Get It Started", featured on "Setting Standards" by Lazee
 2011 "Des ricochets", a charity single by collectif Paris Africa
 2012 "Wanna Feel You Now", featured on "Globetrotter" by Patricia Kazadi

Soundtrack song
 2006 "Get Down on It" from (Astérix et les Vikings)

References

Discographies of French artists